William Andrew Hill (October 28, 1885 – November 29, 1969) was a Canadian professional ice hockey player. He played with the Montreal Shamrocks of the National Hockey Association.

References

1885 births
1969 deaths
Canadian ice hockey players
Montreal Shamrocks players
Ice hockey people from Montreal